LÉ Róisín (P51) is the lead ship of her class of offshore patrol vessel in the Irish Naval Service. Commissioned in 1999, the ship's primary mission is fisheries protection, search and rescue, and maritime protection operations, including vessel boardings. Róisín or Róisín Dubh, is often used as an allegory for Ireland. However, the original Róisín Dubh was a daughter of Red Hugh O’Neill, Earl of Tyrone in the late 16th century.

Design
The ship was designed by Vard Marine (formerly STX Canada Marine) and has an all-steel hull based on the Mauritian Vigilant patrol vessel launched in 1995, but without the helicopter deck and hangar facilities. The level of automation incorporated into the ship's systems allows the ship to be operated with just 47 crew including eight officers. The vessel is designed for winter North Atlantic operations.

Weapon systems

The ship is armed with an OTO Melara 76 mm gun dual purpose gun installed on the bow gun deck. There are also two 12.7 mm machine guns and two 20 mm Rheinmetall Rh202 cannon for anti-aircraft defence.

The main gun is controlled by an Ultra Electronics Command and Control Systems, Radamec 1500 optronic director with a daylight TV camera, thermal imaging camera and eyesafe laser rangefinder. System 1500 functions in automatic or manual mode. The system provides fire control for surface engagement with spotting corrections in both line and range and has an effective secondary self-defence anti-air capability. The ship's Kelvin Hughes surface search radar, operating at E, F and I bands, is installed high on the main mast over the bridge. The Kelvin Hughes navigation radar operates at I-band.

Command and control
The communications package includes VHF, HF, Inmarsat Global Maritime Distress Safety System (GMDSS) and Differential Global Positioning System (DFPS) and secure communications. Three inflatable boats are deployed from each ship; two  Delta rigid inflatable boats (RIB) launched with Caley davits, and a single Avon  RIB.

Propulsion

The ship is powered by two Wärtsilä 16V26 diesel engines each developing  continuous power. The engines drive two shafts with Lips inboard turning controllable pitch propellers via single reduction gearboxes. Each propeller is 2,500 mm in diameter and functions at 300 rpm.

A pair of non-retractable anti-roll fin stabilisers is also fitted.

Three Caterpillar 3412D1-T generators each deliver 405 kW of electric power at 1,500 rpm. One Caterpillar 3406D1-T emergency generator delivers 205 kW at 1,500 rpm.

Construction and career
Róisín was built by Appledore Shipbuilders in Devon, entered service with the Irish Naval Service in September 1999 and is based at the Haulbowline Island, Cork Harbour Headquarters and Dockyard.

As Róisín attempted to assist the submarine, she suffered serious damage from the rough seas and was forced to return to harbour.

Róisín enforced a  exclusion zone around the vessel  which ran aground on 24 July 2013 near Quay Rock at Ballymacus Point, near the Sovereign Islands in southern Ireland, while attempting to enter the harbour near Kinsale, County Cork. Abuk Lion was later taken in tow by Celtic Isle.

From May to July 2016 Róisin was deployed to the Mediterranean as part of a humanitarian mission during the European migrant crisis, and was involved in the rescue of several hundred people from unseaworthy vessels.

As of January 2023, LÉ Róisin and LÉ Niamh were reportedly tied-up at Haulbowline and would not be "[sent] on patrol due to the crippling staffing retention and recruitment crisis in the Defence Forces".

See also

References

External links

 IDF LÉ Róisín webpage
 Web page from the naval architecture firm that designed IDF LÉ Róisín

1999 ships
Ships built in Devon
Róisín-class offshore patrol vessels